The Kizir is a right tributary of the Kazyr. It flows through the Eastern Sayan Mountains in the Krasnoyarsk Krai of Russia. Its source is located in the Kryzhin Range. The river contains many cataracts which make it popular with Siberian rafters. Another tourist attraction is the Kinzelyuk Waterfall, one of the highest in Asia.

References

Rivers of Krasnoyarsk Krai